Czech Film Critics' Award for Best Screenplay is one of the awards given to the best Czech motion picture.

Winners

References

External links

Screenwriting awards for film
Czech Film Critics' Awards
Awards established in 2010